Alkmaar is a hamlet on the Crocodile River some 18 km west of Nelspruit, South Africa. It is named after Alkmaar in the Netherlands.

Geography
Alkmaar is located in the middle of the Schagen Valley, between Nelspruit and Montrose along the R539 (also accessible via the N4, from which it is 18 km to Nelspruit). Alkmaar lies at an altitude of 696 meters and can also be reached by train.

Nature
There is an ecotrial in Alkmaar that visitors can participate in to become aware of nature and the special environment. The Crocodile River flows nearby Alkmaar.

References

Populated places in the Mbombela Local Municipality